The 2/4th Lancers Regiment was a cavalry regiment in the Land Component of the Belgian Armed Forces. It was created by the merging of the 2nd Lancers and the 4th Lancers Regiments. The regiment was the Armoured Battalion of the 1st Brigade. The 2/4th was inactivated in 2010, and the 1/3rd Lancers Battalion became the Armoured Battalion of the 1st Brigade.

External links

Section of the website of the Belgian Ministry of Defence about the 2nd/4th Lancers Regiment - Only available in Dutch and French

Lancers, 2 4
Military units and formations established in 1994
1994 establishments in Belgium
Military units and formations disestablished in 2010
2010 disestablishments in Belgium